Lloyd's Coffee House was a significant meeting place in London in the 17th and 18th centuries.

It was opened by Edward Lloyd (c. 1648 – 15 February 1713) on Tower Street in 1686. The establishment was a popular place for sailors, merchants and shipowners, and Lloyd catered to them by providing reliable shipping news. The shipping industry community frequented the place to discuss maritime insurance, shipbroking and foreign trade. The dealings that took place led to the establishment of the insurance market Lloyd's of London, Lloyd's Register and several related shipping and insurance businesses.

The coffee shop relocated to Lombard Street in December 1691. Lloyd had a pulpit installed in the new premises, from which maritime auction prices and shipping news were announced. Candle auctions were held in the establishment, with lots frequently involving ships and shipping. From 16961697 Lloyd also experimented with publishing a newspaper, Lloyd's News, reporting on shipping schedules and insurance agreements reached in the coffee house. In 1713, the year of Edward Lloyd's death, he modified his will to assign the lease of the coffee house to his head waiter, William Newton, who then married one of Lloyd's daughters, Handy. Newton died the following year and Handy subsequently married Samuel Sheppard. She died in 1720 and Sheppard died in 1727, leaving the coffee house to his sister Elizabeth and her husband, Thomas Jemson. Jemson founded the Lloyd's List newspaper in 1734, similar to the previous Lloyd's News. Merchants continued to discuss insurance matters there until 1774, when the participating members of the insurance arrangement formed a committee and moved to the Royal Exchange on Cornhill as the Society of Lloyd's.

Traces of the coffee house
The 17th century original shop frontage of Lloyd's Coffee House is owned by Lloyd's of London and in 2011 was temporarily re-erected on display at the National Maritime Museum. A blue plaque in Lombard Street commemorates the coffee house's second location (now occupied at ground level by Sainsbury's supermarket). It was fictionalized in the 1936 film Lloyd's of London.

Organisations named after the coffee house

The following is a list of organisations named after Lloyd's Coffee House:
Austrian Lloyd:
Österreichischer Lloyd: an Austrian, major mediterranean shipping company founded in 1833, which after World War I became Lloyd Triestino
Austrian Lloyd Ship Management: a Cypriot company founded in 1991
Germanischer Lloyd, Germany
Hapag-Lloyd, transportation, Germany
Hapag-Lloyd Express, airline, Germany
Hapag-Lloyd Flug, airline, Germany
Lloyd Aéreo Boliviano, airline, Bolivia
Lloyd's List and Lloyd's List Intelligence (formerly Lloyd's MIU), shipping news, London
Lloyd's of London, insurance, London, and the Lloyd's Agency Network they created
Lloyd's Register, risk assessment and mitigation services and management systems certification (originally maritime), London
Norddeutscher Lloyd, shipping, Germany, and the Lloyd (car) created by a subsidiary, and the Lloyd Werft dockyard they also own
P&O Nedlloyd (incorporating Nedlloyd shipping)
Delta Lloyd Group (incorporating Nedlloyd insurance founded 1854)

Lloyds Bank and its related organisations are not named after the London coffee house; the bank was founded in Birmingham by Sampson Lloyd.

See also

References

Coffeehouses and cafés in London
1688 establishments in England
History of the City of London
17th century in London
18th century in London